Goodwater Creek is a stream in Audrain and 
Boone counties in the U.S. state of Missouri. It is a tributary of Youngs Creek.

The stream turns to the east two miles east of the community of Saling.

Goodwater Creek was so named on account of the quality of its water.

See also
List of rivers of Missouri

References

Rivers of Audrain County, Missouri
Rivers of Boone County, Missouri
Rivers of Missouri